Baithakata, also known as Mugarjhor, is a village in Pirojpur District in the Barisal Division of southwestern Bangladesh.

Geography
The village is part of the union council of Malikhali and lies near the eastern shore of Kaliganga River. It is 10 km north of Nazirpur, 80 km west of Barisal and 100 km east of Khulna.

Education
In the village there are the Mugarjhor High School and the Baithakata College.

References

External links
 

Populated places in Pirojpur District